Deh Sefid Karim (also Romanized as Deh Sefīd Karīm; also known as Deh Sefīd) is a village in Kakasharaf Rural District, in the Central District of Khorramabad County, Lorestan Province, Iran. At the 2006 census, its population was 70, in 13 families.

References 

Towns and villages in Khorramabad County